This is a list of prominent Emirati people and who are United Arab Emirates nationals.

Royal families

Al Nahyan family (Al Nahyan royal family – Abu Dhabi)

Sheikh Mohammad bin Zayed Al Nahyan – Ra'is (President) of UAE, Ruler of Abu Dhabi and Supreme Commander of the UAE Armed Forces
The Late Sheikh Khalifa bin Zayed Al Nahyan – Second Ra'is (President) of UAE and former Ruler of Abu Dhabi
Sheikh Sultan bin Zayed bin Sultan Al Nahyan – President's Representative
Sheikh Hamdan bin Zayed bin Sultan Al Nahyan – Ruler's Representative in the Western Region of Abu Dhabi
Sheikh Hamdan bin Mubarak Al Nahyan – Minister of Higher Education and Research Of Science
Sheikh Mansour bin Zayed Al Nahyan – Deputy Prime Minister and Minister of Presidential Affairs
Sheikh Abdullah Bin Zayed Al Nahyan – Minister of Foreign Affairs
The Late Sheikh Zayed bin Sultan Al Nahyan – founding father of the United Arab Emirates and first Ra'is (President)
Sheikha Fatima bint Mubarak Al Ketbi – referred to as the Mother of the United Arab Emirates

Al Maktoum royal family – Dubai
The Late Sheikh Rashid bin Saeed Al Maktoum – Second Prime Minister of the UAE and founder of modern Dubai
The Late Sheikh Maktoum bin Rashid Al Maktoum – First Prime Minister of the UAE
Sheikh Mohammed bin Rashid Al Maktoum – Vice President & Prime Minister of UAE; Ruler of Dubai
The Late Sheikh Hamdan bin Rashid Al Maktoum – Minister of Finance & Industry
Sheikh Hamdan Bin Mohammed bin Rashid Al Maktoum – Crown Prince of Dubai, & Chairman of Dubai Executive Council

Al-Qasimi royal family – Sharjah
Sheikh Sultan bin Muhammad Al-Qasimi – Ruler of Sharjah
Sheikha Lubna Al Qasimi – Minister of Foreign Trade

Al-Qasimi royal family – Ras al-Khaimah
Sheikh Saud bin Saqr al Qasimi – Ruler of RAK

Al Nuaimi royal family – Ajman
Sheikh Humaid bin Rashid Al Nuaimi – Ruler of Ajman
Sheikh Ammar bin Humaid Al Nuaimi – Crown Prince of Ajman
Sheikh Rashid Bin Humaid Al Nuaimi IV

Al Sharqi royal family – Fujairah
Sheikh Hamad bin Mohammed Al Sharqi – Ruler of Fujairah
Sheikh Mohammed bin Hamad bin Mohammed Al Sharqi – Crown Prince of Fujairah

Council of Ministers 

Sheikh Hamdan bin Rashid Al Maktoum – Minister of Finance
Lt-General Sheikh Saif bin Zayed Al Nahyan – Minister of Interior
Sheikh Mansour bin Zayed Al Nahyan – Minister of Presidential Affairs
Sheikh Abdullah bin Zayed Al Nahyan – Foreign Minister of Foreign Affairs
Sheikh Nahyan bin Mubarak Al Nahyan – Minister of Tolerance
Rashid Ahmad Muhammad Bin Fahad – Minister of Environment and Water
Reem Al Hashimi – Minister of State and managing director for the Dubai World Expo 2020 Bid Committee
Mohammed Al Gergawi – Minister of Cabinet Affairs in the Federal Government of the United Arab Emirates
Noura Al Kaabi – Minister of Culture and Knowledge Development and former member of the Federal National Council (15th and 16th Legislative Terms)

Other Federal Government Officials

Lubna Khalid Al Qasimi – former Minister and former Speaker of the Federal National Council
Hawaa Saaed Al Thahak Al Mansoori – Member of the Federal National Council
Jouan Salem Al Dhaheri – Secretary-General and Member of Abu Dhabi National Oil Company (ADNOC)
Khalifa Shaheen Al Marar – Minister of State and former United Arab Emirates Ambassador to Iran
Saeed Khalifa Humeid Al Rumaithi – former secretary of the Ministry of Labor in Abu Dhabi

Businessmen
Ahmed bin Saeed Al Maktoum – CEO of Emirates airlines
Hussain Sajwani – CEO, Damac (real estate)
 Ahmad Ali Al Sayegh – CEO, Dolphin Energy Limited (UAE)
Abdul Aziz Al Ghurair – Banker, chairman, MashreqBank, former president of the Federal National Council, prominent businessman and among Forbes List of Billionaires
Majid Al Futtaim – Majid Al Futtaim & Co, prominent billionaire businessman
Mohammed bin Ali Al Abbar – chairman, Emaar and director, Dubai Economic Department
Saif Ahmad Al Ghurair – UAE, Al-Ghurair Group CEO
Suhail Galadari – UAE, Director, Khaleej Times
Sultan Ahmed bin Sulayem – chairman and CEO of DP World
Mohammad Al Gaz – chairman, United Arab Agencies
Mohamed Juma Al Shamisi – CEO, Abu Dhabi Ports Company (ADPC)
Juma al Majid- businessman – CEO and founder of Juma al majid holding groups
Issa bin Zayed Al Nahyan – businessman and relative of the royal family
Khalaf Ahmad Al Habtoor – Founder and Chairman of the Al Habtoor Group
Abdulraheem Al Masaood – son of Mahmoud Al Masaood; businessman and relative of the royal family prominent billionaire businessman resides in Canada

Businesswomen 
 Amina Al Rustamani – chief executive officer of AWR Properties, director and board member of the family-owned AW Rostamani Group
 Hend Faisal Al Qassemi – Businesswoman, author and journalist
 Muna Al Gurg – Managing director of Retail at Easa Saleh Al Gurg Group
 Her Excellency Dr. Shaikha Ali Salem Al Maskari – Chairperson of Al Maskari Holding (AMH), Emirates & Al Maskari Holdings, and Tricon Energy Operations

Medicine
 Dr. Ali Al Numairy – first Emirati plastic surgeon
 Dr. Moza Sultan Al Kaabi – first Emirati woman orthopedic surgeon.

Astronauts
Hazza Al Mansouri – First Emirati in space and first Arab to board the International Space Station
Sultan Al Neyadi – Second of the two first Emirati astronauts
Nora Al Matrooshi – Second group of astronauts.
Mohammad Al Mulla – Second group of astronauts.

Arts
Amal Al-Agroobi – famous Emirati film director
Abdul Qader Al Raes – famous Emirati painter
Ousha the Poet – famous Nabati poet
 Mehad Hamad
 Najat Makki
 Wafa Hasher Al Maktoum
 Mohammed Kazem
 Hussain Sharif
 Ebtisam Abdulaziz
 Abdullah Al Saadi
 Mohammed Ahmed Ibrahim
 Mattar Bin Lahej
 Moosa Al Halyan
 Abdulraheem Salim
 Ihab Darwish – famous Emirati composer

Innovations
 Reem Al Marzouqi

Sports

Cricketers
 Ali Asad Abbas
 Arshad Ali
 Asghar Ali
 Asim Saeed
 Mohammad Aslam (UAE cricketer)
 Shaukat Dukanwala
 Fahad Usman
 Mazhar Hussain
 Kashif Ahmed
 Khurram Khan
 Arshad Laeeq
 Rizwan Latif
 Ganesh Mylvaganam
 Naeemuddin
 Riaz Poonawala
 Suhail Galadari
 Abdul Rehman (UAE cricketer)
 Azhar Saeed
 Saeed-Al-Saffar
 Johanne Samarasekera
 Sameer Zia
 Shehzad Altaf
 Sohail Butt
 Syed Maqsood
 Sultan Zarawani

ODI cricketers

 Imtiaz Abbasi
 Ali Asad Abbas
 Arshad Ali
 Asghar Ali
 Asim Saeed
 Mohammad Aslam (UAE cricketer)
 Shaukat Dukanwala
 Fahad Usman
 Mazhar Hussain
 Khurram Khan
 Arshad Laeeq
 Rizwan Latif
 Mohammad Ishaq
 Ganesh Mylvaganam
 Naeemuddin
 Riaz Poonawala
 Ramveer Rai
 Saleem Raza (cricketer)
 Abdul Rehman (UAE cricketer)
 Azhar Saeed
 Saeed-Al-Saffar
 Johanne Samarasekera
 Sameer Zia
 Shehzad Altaf
 Sohail Butt
 Syed Maqsood
 Mohammad Tauqeer
 Sultan Zarawani

Bowlers
 Rizwan Latif
 Sameer Zia
 Syed Maqsood

Footballers
Adnan Al-Talyani – professional footballer, who has the most caps in the UAE national football team
 Ali Al-Wehaibi
 Abdulrahman Ibrahim
 Ismail Matar
 Mohamed Omer (football player)
 Saif Mohammed

Rally drivers
 Khalid Al Qassimi
 Mohammed Ben Sulayem

Sport shooters
 Ahmad Mohammad Hasher Al Maktoum – Saeed Mansoor Al Abdulla

Other
Sheikh Ahmad Mohammad Hasher Al Maktoum – ace-shooter and Olympic medalist
Sheikha Maitha bint Mohammed bin Rashid Al Maktoum – karate and taekwondo practitioner
Elham Al Qasimi – first Arab woman to reach the North Pole
Sergiu Toma – Judoka and Olympic medalist

Politics

 Ahmad Al Tayer
 Ali bin Abdulla Al Kaabi
 Saeed Mohammad Al Gandi
 Khalifa bin Zayed Al Nahyan
 Maktoum bin Rashid Al Maktoum
 Mohammed bin Rashid Al Maktoum
 Rashid bin Saeed Al Maktoum
 Mansour bin Zayed Al Nahyan
 Mohammad bin Zayed Al Nahyan
 Nahyan bin Mubarak Al Nahyan
 Qasim Sultan Al Banna
 Lubna Khalid Al Qasimi
 Rashid ibn Abdullah Al Nuaimi
 Shakhbut Bin-Sultan Al Nahyan
 Abdullah bin Zayed Al Nahyan
 Sheikh Nahayan Mabarak Al Nahayan
 Sultan bin Zayed bin Sultan Al Nahyan
 Sultan bin Saeed Al Mansoori
 Anwar Gargash

Writers

See also
List of people from Dubai
United Arab Emirates

References